A high-IQ society is an organization that limits its membership to people who have attained a specified score on an IQ test, usually in the top two percent of the population (98th percentile) or above. These may also be referred to as genius societies. The largest and oldest such society is Mensa International, which was founded by Roland Berrill and Lancelot Ware in 1946.

Entry requirements
High-IQ societies typically accept a variety of IQ tests for membership eligibility; these include WAIS, Stanford-Binet, and Raven's Advanced Progressive Matrices, amongst many others deemed to sufficiently measure or correlate with intelligence. Tests deemed to insufficiently correlate with intelligence (e.g. post-1994 SAT, in the case of Mensa and Intertel) are not accepted for admission. As IQ significantly above 146 SD15 (approximately three-sigma) cannot be reliably measured with accuracy due to sub-test limitations and insufficient norming, IQ societies with cutoffs significantly higher than four-sigma should be considered dubious.

Societies

Some societies accept the results of standardized tests taken elsewhere. Those are listed below by selectivity percentile (assuming the now-standard definition of IQ as a standard score with a median of 100 and a standard deviation of 15 IQ points). Since the 1960s, Mensa has experienced increasing competition in attracting high-IQ individuals, as various new groups have emerged with even stricter and more exclusive admissions requirements. Notable high-IQ societies include:

See also 
 IQ classification

References

Further reading